Panachranta is a monotypic moth genus in the subfamily Arctiinae. Its only species, Panachranta lirioleuca, is found in Australia. Both the genus and species were first described by Turner in 1922.

References

External links

Lithosiini
Monotypic moth genera
Moths of Australia